Lusail Sports Arena, also known as Lusail Multipurpose Hall, is an indoor sports arena located in Lusail, Qatar. It occupies an area of 140,000 sq m in Al Ahli Sports Village. With a seating capacity of over 15,300, it is built to host sporting events including handball, volleyball and basketball tournaments, music concerts etc. One of the largest event hosted at the stadium was the 2015 World Men's Handball Championship.

On 18 January 2019, the arena hosted its biggest music event, a live concert by Arijit Singh presented by OneFM Radio in association with Shop Qatar and ticketing partner WanasaTime.

Construction
The construction of the spectator stadium began in 2012 with a cost of approximately US$318 Million. Dar Al-Handasah designed the sports arena having been commissioned by the Qatar Olympic Committee. The arena was designed to reflect the local Qatari culture featuring the colors of the sea, pearls and the desert sands blended with a central dome inspired by the classic Islamic architecture. The building is designed in a way to reduce the cooling demand by using fritting, shading and bright finishing to minimize the heat effects. It also optimizes the ratio of opaque and glazed walls.

Gallery

References

External links

Lusail Multipurpose Hall 

Indoor arenas in Qatar
Handball venues in Qatar